Codex Balduini Trevirensis (also known as the Balduineum, or as Codex Balduineus), is an illustrated chronicle made c. 1340 for Baldwin of Luxemburg, archbishop of Trier and brother of the late emperor Henry VII.

It covers Henry's Italian campaign of 1310–1313, in which Baldwin himself had been a participant. In this campaign, Henry sought papal coronation as emperor. He successfully brought Northern Italy under imperial control and was crowned King of Italy in Milan. He entered Rome by force, but as St Peters Basilica remained in the hands of his enemies he was crowned emperor at the Lateran on 29 June 1312 by three cardinals of Pope Clement V (who was himself in exile at Avignon). Henry died from malaria a year later, still on campaign.

The codex consists of 37 parchment folia with large illustrations and short annotations describing the main events of Henry's campaign. It also contains the oldest illustration of the College of Prince-electors. It is kept in the state archive of Rhineland-Palatinate at Koblenz (MS 1 C 1).

References

Georg Irmer, Die Romfahrt Kaiser Heinrich's VII im Bildercyclus des Codex Balduini Trevirensis (1881) (archive.org).
 Wolfgang Schmid, Kaiser Heinrichs Romfahrt. Zur Inszenierung von Politik in einer Trierer Bilderhandschrift des 14. Jahrhunderts, Mittelrheinische Hefte 21 (2000).
 Michel Margue, Michel Pauly, Wolfgang Schmid (eds.) (2009),: Der Weg zur Kaiserkrone. Der Romzug Heinrichs VII. in der Darstellung Erzbischof Balduins von Trier, Publications du CLUDEM 24,) Kliomedia, Trier (2009).

1340s books
14th-century manuscripts
14th-century history books
Wars of the Guelphs and Ghibellines
Medieval historical texts
Henry VII, Holy Roman Emperor
Illustrated books